Mikael Steen (born 21 March 1971) is a retired Swedish football midfielder.

References

1971 births
Living people
Swedish footballers
Örebro SK players
Association football midfielders
Allsvenskan players